Benjamin Franklin Cooling III (born 8 December 1938, in Washington, D.C.) is a professor of national security studies at Dwight D. Eisenhower School for National Security and Resource Strategy at the National Defense University in Washington DC. He is the author of more than a dozen books on the American Civil War, including a trilogy on the defense of District of Columbia, a biography of Secretary of the Navy Benjamin Franklin Tracy, and most recently Jubal Early: Robert E. Lee's Bad Old Man.

Family and education
Benjamin Cooling was born in New Brunswick, N.J.on 8 December 1938, the son of Benjamin F. Cooling II (1895–1959) and his wife, Helena E. née Weisshaar (1899–1981).  His father was a research chemist by profession, worked in both the private and public sector.  While attending Coolidge High School in Washington, D.C., he was cadet colonel in a junior ROTC program and a star athlete in football and track 1955–1957t. He received his Bachelor of Arts from Rutgers University, where he sang in the Glee Club, participated in the Scarlet Rifles (Army drill team), helped organize a Civil War Round Table with Earl Schenk Myers, was a dorm proctor, member of the Phi Sigma Kappa fraternity and the History Club.  He received his Master of Arts and Ph.D. from the University of Pennsylvania and wrote his doctoral dissertation, Benjamin Franklin Tracy: Lawyer, Soldier, Secretary of the Navy in 1969.

Career

Cooling's professional career spanned 60 years as a U.S. civil servant with the National Park Service, Department of Energy and Departments of the Army, Air Force and Defense.  He served in the U.S. Army Reserve, 1956–1963. He has taught at the University of Pennsylvania, PMC Colleges, George Washington University, U.S. Army War College and retired as Professor of National Security and Resourcing Strategy at the National Defense University. He is also former officer and trustee of the Society for Military History, and received the Society's Victor Gondos Memorial Service Award. He is a past Fellow of the Company of Military Historians; he held an advanced research fellowship from the Naval War College in 1974. He has received the Joint Meritorious Civilian Service Award from the Joint Chiefs of Staff, Department of Defense, Distinguished Research Award from the Industrial College of the Armed Forces, the Douglas Southall Freeman award from the Military Order of the Stars and Bars, the Fletcher Pratt award from the New York Civil War Round Table, and the Moncado award from the American Military Institute for his scholarship.

Cooling is a renowned national security and Civil War historian, educator and lecturer who has published twenty-two books and over one hundred articles on aspects of military, naval and air history.  He specializes in development of the Military-Industrial Complex and national security state.

Writings
Cooley has published 120 works in 275 publications in 2 languages; his principal writings include:
Counter-thrust: from the Peninsula to the Antietam,  11 editions published between 2007–  2013
To the battles of Franklin and Nashville and beyond: stabilization and reconstruction in Tennessee and Kentucky, 1864– 1866, eight editions published between 1988– 2010Forts Henry and Donelson—the key to the Confederate heartland, six editions published between 1987– 1997Symbol, sword, and shield: defending Washington during the Civil War, ten editions published between 1975– 991War, business, and American society: historical perspectives on the military-industrial complex, 13 editions published in 1977The day Lincoln was almost shot: the Fort Stevens story, five editions published between 2013– 2015 in EnglishGray steel and blue water Navy: the formative years of America's military-industrial complex, 1881–1917, nine editions published between 1979– 1999Case studies in the development of close air support, 9 editions published between 1990– 2015Benjamin Franklin Tracy: father of the modern American fighting Navy, five editions published in 1973Jubal Early's Raid on Washington, six editions published between 1989– 2007Jubal Early: Robert E. Lee’s Bad Old Man (2014)''

Notes

1938 births
Living people
American military historians
Rutgers University alumni
University of Pennsylvania alumni